"Think About the Way" is a song by British-based rapper Ice MC, released in March 1994 as the second single from his third album, Ice'n'Green (1994), on which it appears in four versions, and his tenth single overall. It was produced by Roberto Zanetti, also known as Robyx, and was written by Zanetti and Ice MC, though many releases credit Zanetti as the sole writer. The female vocals were performed by Alexia, though she was also uncredited. The song was very successful in Europe, reaching the top 5 in Belgium and Italy, and the top 15 in Denmark, France, Germany, Spain, Switzerland, Sweden and the Netherlands. It was released under the title "Think About the Way (Bom Digi Bom...)" in UK and Ireland, which it refers to the first words of the first verse.

After being featured in the soundtrack of the film Trainspotting, the song was re-issued in the UK in September 1996, achieving greater success than its original release reaching number 38 in the UK Singles Chart, and number five in the Scottish Singles Chart. Remixes were released in 2002, in 2007 by Frisco vs Ice MC, and in 2009 by Gigi Barocco vs Ice MC.

Critical reception
Pan-European magazine Music & Media concluded, "It was only a matter of time, but the cross between Euro dance and ragga is a fact now. Visualise the male character in Culture Beat as a Jamaican toaster instead of an ordinary rapper." An editor, Maria Jimenez, declared it as a "nearly guaranteed" hit, noting Ice MC's "ragga raps over techno pop beats". Brad Beatnik from Music Weeks RM Dance Update wrote, "With a subtitle and chorus of 'bom digi digi bom', plenty of piano and synth, percussion crescendos and a ragga-style vocal, it's not surprising this is currently a huge European hit. It has all the ingredients for being a smash here too." Another editor, James Hamilton said, "UK born Ian Campbell's unstoppable cheesy Euro smash is an ultra commercial catchy cod 'ragga' rapped and plaintive Jasmine (from Germany) whined 133bpm galloper".

Chart performance
"Think About the Way" was a major hit on the charts on several continents and remains Ice MC's most successful song to date. In Europe, it reached the top 10 in Belgium, Denmark, Italy, Scotland, Spain and Switzerland. Additionally, the single made it to the top 20 in Finland, France, Germany, Iceland, Ireland, the Netherlands and Sweden, as well as on the Eurochart Hot 100, where it peaked at number 18. In the United Kingdom, "Think About the Way" reached its highest position as number 38 in its second run on the UK Singles Chart, on September 8, 1996. It had previously peaked at number 42 in 1994. On the UK Dance Chart, it was a even bigger hit, reaching number six. Outside Europe, the single peaked at number four on the RPM Dance/Urban chart in Canada and was also successful in Israel, reaching number five there.

Music video
The accompanying music video for "Think About the Way" was directed by Giacomo De Simone, but it didn't feature Alexia. It was A-listed on Germany's VIVA in June 1994. The video was later published on YouTube channel in September 2014. By November 2022, it had generated more than 27 million views. De Simone would go on directing the video for Ice MC's next single, "It's a Rainy Day".

Adaptations
Trance DJ and producer act Virtual Vault made a new version of the track featuring the original vocals from Alexia and Ice MC called Think About The Way 2010. In 2011, the German dance band Groove Coverage made a revamped release also called "Think About the Way" featuring vocals from Rameez. Although the Groove Coverage song released on Suprime Records, Sony Music Entertainment released on March 16, 2012, borrows the music and the main refrain of the song, it adds new lyrics in the rest of the song. The Groove Coverage version had been popular in dance venues and a minor hit in Germany reaching number 54 in the German Media Control AG charts.

In 2012, the Iranian-Swedish artist Arash released a musical adaptation of the song called "She Makes Me Go" that borrows widely from the original but with completely new lyrics. Released on initially on EMI Music Sweden and Extravaganza Records on September 17, 2012, it featured Jamaican dancehall singer Sean Paul and was co-written by Roberto Zanetti, Alex Arash Labaf and Sean Henriques (Sean Paul). Re-released on February 15, 2013 on Universal Music in Germany and other European countries, "She Makes Me Go" has charted in Germany, Switzerland, Austria, Romania and Poland.

In 2013, Canadian DJ Anthony Simons produced a cover with Anna Berardi.

Track listings

 12" maxi, UK (1996) "Bom Digi Bom" (the Dyme Brothers mix) – 6:05
 "Bom Digi Bom" (original extended mix) – 7:12
 "Bom Digi Bom" (LuvDup 'Cliffy' vocal mix) – 7:09
 "Bom Digi Bom" (the Dyme Brothers dub)

 12" maxi, Belgium, Italy, France, Germany (1994) "Think About the Way" (extended mix) – 7:08
 "Think About the Way" (doop dibby dub mix) – 3:20
 "Think About the Way" (radio mix) – 4:16
 "Think About the Way" (acapella) – 4:16 (track not available for France and Germany)

 CD single, France (1994) "Think About the Way" (radio mix) – 4:16
 "Think About the Way" (extended mix) – 7:08

 CD single, UK (1994) "Think About the Way" (original radio edit) – 4:19
 "Think About the Way" (LuvDup "Cliffy" vocal mix) – 7:09
 "Think About the Way" (Jules & Skins pumped up club mix) – 5:55
 "Think About the Way" (original extended Italian mix) – 7:12
 "Think About the Way" (doop dibby dub) – 3:19
 "Think About the Way" (Jules & Skins dattman reggae jam) – 6:16

 CD maxi, Germany, Belgium, France, Italy, Sweden (1994) "Think About the Way" (radio mix) – 4:16
 "Think About the Way" (extended mix) – 7:08
 "Think About the Way" (doop dibby dub mix) – 3:20
 "Think About the Way" (a cappella) – 4:16

 CD maxi, UK (1994) "Think About the Way" (original radio edit) – 4:19
 "Think About the Way" (LuvDup "Cliffy" vocal mix) – 7:09
 "Think About the Way" (Jules & Skins pumped up club mix) – 5:55
 "Think About the Way" (original extended Italian mix) – 7:12
 "Think About the Way" (doop dibby dub) – 3:19
 "Think About the Way" (Jules & Skins dattman reggae jam) – 6:16

 CD maxi, US / 12" maxi, Germany (1994) "Think About the Way" (noche de luna mix) – 6:22
 "Think About the Way" (dattman reggae jam) – 6:17
 "Think About the Way" (extended mix) – 7:12
 "Think About the Way" (pumped up club mix) – 5:54
 "Think About the Way" (LuvDup mix) – 7:09
 "Think About the Way" (pumped up with girl) – 3:58

 CD maxi, Canada (1994) "Think About the Way" (radio mix) – 4:17
 "Think About the Way" (extended mix) – 7:10
 "Think About the Way" (noche de luna mix) – 6:22
 "Think About the Way" (dattman reggae jam) – 6:14
 "Think About the Way" (LuvDup dub) – 7:03
 "Think About the Way" (pumped up club mix) – 5:51
 "Think About the Way" (LuvDup remix) – 7:03
 "Think About the Way" (pumped up with girl) – 5:53

 CD maxi, UK (1996) "Bom Digi Bom (Think About the Way)" (radio edit) – 3:48
 "Bom Digi Bom (Think About the Way)" (original extended mix) – 7:12
 "Bom Digi Bom (Think About the Way)" (the Dyme Brothers mix) – 6:05
 "Bom Digi Bom (Think About the Way)" (Jules & Skins pumped up club mix) – 5:55
 "Bom Digi Bom (Think About the Way)" (LuvDup 'Cliffy' vocal mix) – 7:09
 "Bom Digi Bom (Think About the Way)" (doop dibby dub) – 3:19

 CD maxi - Remixes, Germany (1994) "Think About the Way" (noche de luna mix) – 6:22
 "Think About the Way" (dattman reggae) – 6:18
 "Think About the Way" (pumped up club mix) – 5:54

 CD maxi - Remixes, Italy (1994)'
 "Think About the Way" (radio mix) – 4:16
 "Think About the Way" (noche de luna mix) – 6:22
 "Think About the Way" (dattman reggae jam) – 6:18
 "Think About the Way" (LuvDup dub) – 7:10
 "Think About the Way" (pumped club mix) – 5:54
 "Think About the Way" (LuvDup remix) – 7:10
 "Think About the Way" (pumped up with girl) – 5:58

Charts

Weekly charts

1 By Frisco Vs ICE MC

Year-end charts

References

1994 singles
1994 songs
1996 singles
2007 singles
English-language Italian songs
Eurodance songs
Ice MC songs
Music videos directed by Giacomo De Simone
Songs written by Roberto Zanetti